Shit My Dad Says is a Twitter feed started by Justin Halpern, who, at the time, was a semi-employed comedy writer.  It consists of quotations made by Halpern's father, Sam, regarding various subjects.  Halpern started the account on August 3, 2009, soon after moving from Los Angeles back to his parents' house in San Diego. He intended it only as a storage site for his father's salty comments, but a friend posted a link to it. Comedian Rob Corddry then tweeted the link, and that really "jump-started it" according to Halpern. In less than a month, the page was mentioned by The Daily Show, a popular San Francisco blog called Laughing Squid, and actress Kristen Bell. , the feed has 2.2 million followers. The account has largely been inactive since 2014, with only two tweets since then and none after 2017.

Adaptations

Book
In September 2009, Halpern found an agent and started sifting through book deals. He signed an agreement with Harper Collins in October 2009. The book based on the feed, titled Sh*t My Dad Says, was co-written with Halpern's longtime writing partner Patrick Schumacker, and was released on May 4, 2010.  During its first week, the book reached #8 on The New York Times Best Seller list for hardcover nonfiction. For six weeks after its release, the book was #1 on the bestseller list.

Television series

In November 2009, CBS announced that it was developing a television sitcom based on the Twitter feed, which would star William Shatner. The series, officially titled $#*! My Dad Says (spoken as Bleep My Dad Says), was green-lighted by CBS in May 2010 and began airing on CBS on Thursday nights.

On May 15, 2011, CBS announced that it had canceled $#*! My Dad Says, despite winning the People's Choice Award for Best New Comedy.

References

External links 

Twitter accounts
Internet properties established in 2009
2010 non-fiction books